The 2009 FEI European Jumping and Dressage Championships, also known as the 2009 Alltech FEI European Jumping and Dressage Championships, is the 30th edition of the European Show Jumping Championships and the 26th edition of the European Dressage Championship. It was held at Windsor Castle in Windsor, England, from August 25 to August 30, 2009. For the first time, the European Jumping Championships and the European Dressage Championship are being held at the same time. 92 competitors from 24 nations will compete in the jumping competition, while 54 competitors from 19 nations will compete in the dressage competition.

Events

Jumping

Individual

Team

Dressage

Individual freestyle

Individual special

Team

Medal summary

Medal table

Medalists

References

External links
Official website

 
European Show Jumping Championships
European Dressage Championships
2000s in Berkshire
Sport in Berkshire
Equestrian sports competitions in the United Kingdom